Granite Peak, at an elevation of  above sea level, is the highest natural point in the U.S. state of Montana, and the tenth-highest state high point in the nation. It lies within the Absaroka-Beartooth Wilderness in Park County, very near the borders of Stillwater County and Carbon County.

Granite Peak is often considered the second most difficult state high point to climb after Denali in Alaska, due to technical climbing, poor weather, and route finding. Granite Peak's first ascent was made by Elers Koch, James C. Whitham, and R.T. Ferguson on August 29, 1923, after several failed attempts by others. It was the last of the state high points to be climbed. Today, climbers typically spend two or three days ascending the peak, stopping over on the Froze-to-Death Plateau, although some climbers choose to ascend the peak in a single day. Another route that has gained popularity in recent years is the Southwest Couloir route, a non-technical route from the south starting near Cooke City; climbers generally take two days to complete it.

See also
 
 
 List of mountains in Montana
 List of U.S. states by elevation

References

External links

 
 
  An organization dedicated to preserving the natural beauty of Granite Peak in Montana.

Mountains of Montana
Mountains of Park County, Montana
Beartooth Mountains
Highest points of U.S. states
Custer National Forest
North American 3000 m summits